The Brunton Baronetcy, of Stratford Place in St Marylebone, is a title in the Baronetage of the United Kingdom. It was created on 17 July 1908 for the physician Lauder Brunton. As of 2007 the title is held by his great-grandson, the fourth Baronet, who succeeded his father in 2007. He is a Professor of Medicine at the University of Toronto, Canada.

Brunton baronets, of Stratford Place (1908)
Sir (Thomas) Lauder Brunton, 1st Baronet (1844–1916)
Sir (James) Stopford Lauder Brunton, 2nd Baronet (1884–1943)
Sir (Edward Francis) Lauder Brunton, 3rd Baronet (1916–2007)
Sir James Lauder Brunton, 4th Baronet (born 1947)

Notes

References

Brunton